The Croatia women's national field hockey team represents Croatia in women's international field hockey competitions and is controlled by the Croatian Hockey Federation, the governing body for field hockey in Croatia.

The team competes in the Women's EuroHockey Championship III, the third level of the women's European field hockey championships.

Tournament record

EuroHockey Championship III
2005 – 4th place
2007 – 5th place
2015 – 4th place
2017 – 4th place
2019 – 4th place
2021 – 4th place

See also
Croatia men's national field hockey team

References

European women's national field hockey teams
National team
Field hockey